Crunchyroll Manga is a digital manga anthology published by Crunchyroll in North America. It began distribution on October 30, 2013. The service launched with a lineup of twelve titles, with chapters released simultaneously with their Japanese release. Crunchyroll Manga provides English speaking readers with officially licensed editions of the latest installments of popular manga published by Futabasha, Kodansha, Kadokawa Shoten and Shōnen Gahōsha soon after their release in Japan.

History
On October 26, 2013, Crunchyroll confirmed that the Crunchyroll Manga service would be released October 30, 2013. The service will be available in 170 countries, with the exception of Japan, China, France, Germany and Italy.

On February 17, 2018, Crunchyroll announced that Kodansha titles excluding Fairy Tail would be removed from the manga section of the site on March 1. The titles are still available for purchase as eBooks. On March 1, 2018, Crunchyroll announced that they would simultaneously publish new Kodansha manga titles as they release in Japan.

Features
Manga chapters are available to read online through the website or on web-enabled devices through Crunchyroll or an official app. Readers can sign up for an All-Access or Manga subscription for full access to several manga titles. Anime and Drama subscribers can read only the latest chapters with limited advertisements.

The format of the anthology generally mirrors that of the equivalent magazine issues, typically featuring the same cover illustrations, as well as color interior pages. If a physical copy or digital copy of a series is available for sale, it might not be available on Crunchyroll Manga.

Full series

Ongoing series

Series that are still currently running in Crunchyroll Manga.

Completed series
Series that have completed their serialization in Crunchyroll Manga.

References

External links

Online magazines published in the United States
Anime and manga magazines
 
Magazines established in 2013
2013 establishments in the United States
Magazines published in San Francisco
Shōnen manga